Ayumi Hamasaki Countdown Live 2013-2014 A is Japanese pop singer Ayumi Hamasaki's 13th Countdown concert DVD. It was released on April 30, 2014. Hamasaki performed three dates at the Yoyogi National Gymnasium for this countdown, respectively on December 29, 30 and 31, 2013. It was released in two formats: a DVD edition (AVBD-92110) and also a Blu-Ray one (AVXD-91692).

The DVD/Blu-ray includes the first ever live performances of the songs "Feel The Love" and "Merry-go-round". Both were released as a double A-side single called "Feel The Love/Merry-Go-Round". The single was promoted during the concert and later included on Hamasaki's 15th studio album Colours, which was released in 2014.

Track list
From Amazon and Yesasia.

 Feel the love
 We Wish
 Free & Easy
 Because of You
 Love is All
 Carols
 Momentum
 Electrocinema Break
 Is This Love?
 Love Song
 Merry-go-round
 You & Me
 Surreal ~ evolution ~ Surreal

Encore
 Part Of Me
 Curtain call
 Boys & Girls
 Humming 7/4
 Bold & Delicious

Sales
DVD: 15,827
Blu-ray: 5,521
Total : 21,348

References

Ayumi Hamasaki video albums
Live video albums
Albums recorded at the Yoyogi National Gymnasium